Bottom of the World is a 2017 drama film. It was directed by Richard Sears, written by Brian Gottlieb and stars Jena Malone, Douglas Smith and Ted Levine.

Plot
A couple traveling along Route 66 toward Los Angeles stop at a hotel. When Scarlett (Jena Malone) disappears, Alex (Douglas Smith) begins a search then is brought into the desert by a masked stranger. Alex wakes, only to find himself in a different life although he retains memories of Scarlett.

Cast

Production
Filming began in Ottawa, Ontario, Canada, on September 1, 2014. Filming also was located near Gallup, New Mexico and Albuquerque, New Mexico.

Release
Bottom of the World was released on DVD and video on demand on February 1, 2017.

References

External links

2017 films
American drama films
Canadian drama films
Films set in deserts
English-language Canadian films
2017 drama films
2010s English-language films
2010s American films
2010s Canadian films